David Holland "Baldy" Tomlinson (c. 1926 – November 10, 2005) was a Canadian football player who played for the Calgary Stampeders and Montreal Alouettes. He won the Grey Cup with the Stampeders in 1948. He previously played football for the McGill University Redmen. He died at the age of 79 in November 2005.

References

1920s births
2005 deaths
Canadian football people from Calgary
Players of Canadian football from Alberta
Calgary Stampeders players
Montreal Alouettes players